Euchromatic histone-lysine N-methyltransferase 2 (EHMT2), also known as G9a, is a histone methyltransferase enzyme that in humans is encoded by the EHMT2 gene. G9a catalyzes the mono- and di-methylated states of histone H3 at lysine residue 9 (i.e., H3K9me1 and H3K9me2) and lysine residue 27 (H3K27me1 and HeK27me2).

Function 

A cluster of genes, BAT1-BAT5, has been localized in the vicinity of the genes for TNF alpha and TNF beta. This gene is found near this cluster; it was mapped near the gene for C2 within a 120-kb region that included a HSP70 gene pair. These genes are all within the human major histocompatibility complex class III region. This gene was thought to be two different genes, NG36 and G9a, adjacent to each other but a recent publication shows that there is only a single gene. The protein encoded by this gene is thought to be involved in intracellular protein-protein interaction. There are three alternatively spliced transcript variants of this gene but only two are fully described.

G9a and G9a-like protein, another histone-lysine N-methyltransferase, catalyze the synthesis of H3K9me2, which is a repressive mark. G9a is an important control mechanism for epigenetic regulation within the nucleus accumbens (NAcc); reduced G9a expression in the NAcc plays a central role in mediating the development of an addiction.  G9a opposes increases in ΔFosB expression via H3K9me2 and is suppressed by ΔFosB. G9a exerts opposite effects to that of ΔFosB on drug-related behavior (e.g., self-administration) and synaptic remodeling (e.g., dendritic arborization – the development of additional tree-like dendritic branches and spines) in the nucleus accumbens, and therefore opposes ΔFosB's function as well as increases in its expression. G9a and ΔFosB share many of the same gene targets. In addition to its role in the nucleus accumbens, G9a play a critical role in the development and the maintenance of neuropathic pain. Following peripheral nerve injury, G9a regulates the expression of +600 genes in the dorsal root ganglia. This transcriptomic change reprograms the sensory neurons to a hyperexcitable state leading to mechanical pain hypersensitivity.

Interactions 

EHMT2 has been shown to interact with KIAA0515 and the prostate tissue associated homeodomain protein NKX3.1.

References

Further reading